Jimmie Sven Ericsson (born 22 February 1980) is a Swedish former professional ice hockey Left Wing who played for Skellefteå AIK of the Swedish Hockey League (SHL).

Playing career
In 2013 Ericsson was awarded the Guldpucken and Peter Forsberg Trophy after a season where Skellefteå AIK won the Swedish Championship for the first time since 1978.

In 2014 Ericsson help lead Skellefteå AIK to the Swedish Championship for the second year in a row, becoming the first club to repeat as champions since Djurgårdens IF in 2000 and 2001. Ericsson was the third-leading scorer during the playoffs, recording twelve goals and two assists in fourteen games.

After 8 seasons in the SHL with Skellefteå, Ericsson opted for a new challenge in signing a one-year contract with Russian club, SKA Saint Petersburg of the KHL on 28 May 2014.

International play

Ericsson won a gold medal with Tre Kronor at the 2013 World Championship. Ericsson broke a rib in a preliminary game against Norway, however he continued to play in the remaining six games of the tournament.

Jimmie's younger brother Jonathan is a defenseman who is currently playing for the Detroit Red Wings. The Ericsson brothers were set to play together professionally for the first time at the 2010 World Championships. Following Detroit's elimination in the 2010 Stanley Cup playoffs, Jonathan joined Sweden's national team at the World Championships. The brothers were in the lineup together, however; Jimmie injured his knee on his first shift, and missed the rest of the tournament, so they were never on the ice together. The brothers played together for the first time at the 2014 Winter Olympics in Sochi, where they won the silver medal. Jimmie was the only non-NHL player on the team.

Ericsson represented Sweden at the 2014 IIHF World Championship, where he recorded two goals in ten games, and won a bronze medal. Ericsson represented Sweden at the 2015 IIHF World Championship, where he recorded two assists in eight games. Ericsson represented Sweden at the 2016 IIHF World Championship, where he captained the team, and recorded one goal and three assists in eight games.

Career statistics

Regular season and playoffs

International

Awards and honors

See also
List of Olympic medalist families

References

External links
 

1980 births
Ice hockey players at the 2014 Winter Olympics
Leksands IF players
Living people
Medalists at the 2014 Winter Olympics
Olympic ice hockey players of Sweden
Olympic medalists in ice hockey
Olympic silver medalists for Sweden
People from Skellefteå Municipality
SKA Saint Petersburg players
Skellefteå AIK players
Swedish ice hockey left wingers
Sportspeople from Västerbotten County